Ice King is a character in the TV series Adventure Time.

Ice King may also refer to:

 The Ice King (novel), a 1983 novel by Michael Scott Rohan and Allan Scott
 Charles W. Morse, an American businessman nicknamed "Ice King"
 Frederic Tudor, an American businessman nicknamed "Ice King"
 USS Ice King (ID-3160) a refrigerated cargo ship during World War I
 The Ice King, a character from the seventh season of Fortnite: Battle Royale

See also
 Ice Kings, a 2006 documentary
 Ice Kings (football)